The Pudding River is a  tributary of the Molalla River in the U.S. state of Oregon. Among its tributaries are Silver Creek, Butte Creek, Abiqua Creek, and the Little Pudding River.

Historically, the Pudding River flowed directly into the Willamette River, and aerial photos dating back to 1936 provide evidence of the Willamette River's confluence with the Pudding River mainstem channel.  Currently, it flows directly into the Molalla River near River Mile 1 before joining the Willamette River. Anadromous and resident salmonids use the Lower Pudding River main stem and key tributaries that support the basin's ecosystems.

Geology
About 24 million years ago at the end of the Oligocene, Oregon had started to look how it is today and the Willamette Bay finally became the Willamette Valley by drying up and being raised above sea level, after assuming a shape much like today's Puget Sound.

Course
The Pudding River Basin's complex of headwater creeks originates from the western edge of the Cascade Mountains along a snowpack-limited ridgeline (i.e. no glaciers are present) that forms a critical linkage from the Mount Hood National Forest and Table Rock Wilderness to Silver Falls State Park and the rolling Waldo Hills east of Salem. After emerging from the Cascade Mountain foothills of the Panther Rock Ridge and its unique forested upper-elevation wetlands and lakes, the key tributaries of the watershed like ecologically-important Butte Creek converge near Woodburn into the meandering Pudding River. Passing through and within the Pudding River Valley, the numerous subwatersheds of the Pudding Basin represent a vital part of fertile agricultural lands of the Lower Willamette Valley sub-basin. The river continues northward past the town of Aurora. For most of its course, Butte Creek and the Lower Pudding River mainstem defines the boundary between Marion and Clackamas Counties.

Fishing
The upper river offers catch-and-release fishing for wild trout, while the lower river has bass and panfish. Although the Pudding River is not stocked with hatchery fish, coastal cutthroat trout and rainbow trout enter the upper main stem from Drift, Butte, Silver, and Abiqua creeks. Fishing is restricted to artificial flies and lures and is not allowed for winter-run steelhead (anadromous rainbow trout) that spawn in the tributaries. The extreme lower reaches of the river are navigable by boat when the stream flow is sufficient, sometimes as late as June.

See also
 List of rivers of Oregon
 List of longest streams of Oregon

References

External links
 Pudding River Watershed Council
 NOAA hydrology site for the Pudding River at Aurora
 Oregon Department of Transportation Photographs:
 Pudding River Bridge at Aurora
 Covered Bridge over Pudding River near Barlow
 Covered Bridge over Pudding River in Marion County

Rivers of Oregon
Rivers of Marion County, Oregon
Rivers of Clackamas County, Oregon